The IOOF Opera House in Hampton, Nebraska, United States, is a  by  building that was built in 1880 and was leased to the International Order of Odd Fellows (IOOF) chapter in 1893.  In 1988, when it was nominated for the National Register of Historic Places, it was the only two-story building in the retail business area of Hampton.

It was deemed significant at the state level in the areas of the performing arts; entertainment/recreation; and social history, as a well-preserved example of an opera house building in Nebraska.

Its decline was partly due to the fact that Aurora, Nebraska, 6 miles away, and Grand Island, Nebraska, 26 miles away, offered more entertainment choices to car-owning residents.

It is a "two-part commercial block" building that served historically as a meeting hall, as a theater, as a specialty store, as a music facility, and as a financial institution.  It was listed on the National Register of Historic Places in 1988.

Notes

References

Theatres on the National Register of Historic Places in Nebraska
Buildings and structures in Hamilton County, Nebraska
Odd Fellows buildings in Nebraska
Theatres completed in 1893
Clubhouses on the National Register of Historic Places in Nebraska
National Register of Historic Places in Hamilton County, Nebraska
Opera houses on the National Register of Historic Places in Nebraska
Opera houses in Nebraska